HMAS Barcoo (K375/F375/A245) was a  of the Royal Australian Navy (RAN). One of twelve frigates constructed in Australia during World War II, Barcoo (named after the Barcoo River), was laid down by Cockatoo Docks & Engineering Company, Sydney in 1942, and commissioned in early 1944.

Most of the ship's wartime service was spent in New Guinea waters; with primary duties including patrol, convoy escort, troop transport, along with the shelling of Japanese positions. In April 1945, Barcoo was attached to the Borneo campaign. She was the command ship for a landing craft division at the Tarakan landings in May, and directly supported the North Borneo landings in June, before being assigned to general escort and fire support roles.

After World War II, Barcoo was converted into a survey ship. In 1948, the ship spent over a week aground on West Beach, South Australia after bring driven ashore by a storm. Barcoo spent the rest of her career surveying the waters of Australia and New Guinea, except for periods of deactivation from 1949 to 1951, and from 1956 to 1959. She was decommissioned for the final time in 1964, and sold for scrapping.

Design and construction

Barcoo was one of twelve frigates built in Australia during World War II. She and seven other vessels were constructed to the British River-class design. The frigate displaced 1,340 tonnes at standard load and 1,923 tonnes at full load. Propulsion machinery consisted of two Admiralty 3-drum boilers, feeding steam to reciprocating vertical triple expansion engines, which provided  to drive two propeller shafts. The ship's company consisted of 140 personnel.

Main armament for the frigate consisted of two QF /45 calibre Mark XVI guns in single HA/LA Mark XX mounts. This was supplemented by two QF 40 mm Bofors in single Mark VII mounts, and six QF 20 mm Oerlikons in single Mark III mounts. The ship also carried three anti-submarine mortars (one Hedgehog and two Squids) as well as depth charge throwers.

Barcoo was laid down by the Cockatoo Docks & Engineering Company, Sydney on 21 October 1942, launched on 26 August 1943 by the wife of Richard Keane, the Minister for Trade and Customs, and commissioned on 17 January 1944.

Operational history

World War II
After several weeks of working up, Barcoo was tasked to New Guinea in March 1944 for convoy escort duty. Barcoo and the corvette  shelled Japanese positions on Kar Kar Island and at Banabun Harbour. From June to August, the frigate was heavily involved in convoy escort and troop transport duties. On 28 August, Barcoo rescued two United States Army Air Force pilots who had been forced to ditch their P-47 Thunderbolts at sea. During September and October, Barcoo returned to Sydney for maintenance refits. Returning to the New Guinea operations area, Barcoo operated against Japanese positions in New Guinea during November, including the shelling of Wilde Bay. Convoy escort and patrol duties continued until late January 1945, when the frigate returned to Australia.

Barcoo was deployed again to New Guinea in late March 1945, and in April was assigned to United States Navy Task Force 78.1 to support the Borneo campaign. For the Tarakan landings on 1 May, Barcoo was designated as the ship in charge of the landing craft tank division of the assault force. Barcoo was also involved in the North Borneo landings in June, then was assigned to general escort and fire support duties for the rest of the campaign. The frigate fired in anger for the last time on 3 August 1945, during a bombardment of the village of Soengaipaten in Borneo.

Barcoo received the three battle honours for her wartime service: "Pacific 1944–45", "New Guinea 1944", and "Borneo 1945".

Post-war
Immediately after the war, Barcoo was tasked with repatriation of soldiers and prisoners-of-war, along with patrols of reoccupied areas. After this, the frigate was docked for an eight-month refit at Williamstown Dockyard to convert her into a survey ship. Modification work was completed in July 1946, and the ship began surveying operations in August 1946. During her remaining career, she carried the pennant numbers F375 and A245 at various times.

The ship was almost constantly deployed on survey operations in the waters of Australia and New Guinea for the next three years. In 1947, Barcoo conveyed Australian officials to Timor for visits to the governor of Portuguese (East) Timor and the Dutch colonial administrative centre in West Timor. During April 1948, Barcoo and the sloop  were deployed together for surveying operations off South Australia. On 11 April 1948, Barcoo ran aground at West Beach, South Australia, having been driven ashore by a violent storm. Despite attempts to lighten the frigate by removing munitions and stores, the combined efforts of three tugboats were unable to pull Barcoo off the beach. A dredger was brought from Adelaide, which cleared a channel behind the stranded frigate. On the evening of 20 April, over a week after the initial beaching, Barcoo was able to be refloated. Warrego towed Barcoo to Port Adelaide for inspection and repairs.

Barcoo was placed in reserve in May 1949. She was recommissioned in March 1951 for use as a training vessel for anti-submarine exercises. The ship resumed survey duties of the Australian coast from July 1952 to April 1956, then returned to Sydney and was paid off on 25 September. The ship was reactivated for further survey work on 7 December 1959. By this point, the ship's armament had been reduced to a single 40 mm Bofors gun. Other modifications around the time of her reactivation included the strengthening of the forward tripod mast, and the addition of a deckhouse on the aft deck.

Decommissioning and fate

Barcoo was decommissioned on 21 February 1964. The frigate had travelled  during her career. The ship was sold for scrapping on 15 February 1972 to N. W. Kennedy, Ltd., Vancouver. The frigate was towed from Sydney to Hong Kong in March, then was taken to Taiwan to be broken up.

Citations

References

Books

News articles

Websites

External links

Cockatoo Island Dockyard: Ships – HMAS Barcoo 

River-class frigates of the Royal Australian Navy
Ships built in New South Wales
Survey ships of the Royal Australian Navy
1943 ships
Maritime incidents in 1948